Waaris is a Hindi television crime drama series directed by Bhushan Patel that aired on Zee TV channel from 28 July 2008 until 4 December 2008. The plot is similar in quite a few aspects to the Ram Gopal Varma films, Sarkar (2005) and Sarkar Raj (2008). The series ran for a total of 64 episodes, excluding the 12 episodes that could have broadcast but were canceled due to the Indian Television Strike that occurred for 3 weeks long.

Plot
The story is based on the life of an underworld mafia don, Rudra Pratap Singh, who is searching for a true or suitable "Waaris" (inherent, heir) for the position that he created in his criminal-world.

Cast
 Mohammed Iqbal Khan as Shankar Pratap Singh
 Ashish Vidyarthi as Rudra Pratap Singh
 Indira Krishnan as Yashoda Rudra Pratap Singh
 Gauri Nigudkar as Swati Pratap Singh
 Yuvraj Malhotra as Shaurya Pratap Singh
 Akshay Sethi as Karan
 Shilpa Shinde as Gayatri Shankar Pratap Singh
 Rucha Gujarathi as Simran
 Khushboo Purohit as Swati
 Kiran Kumar as Ganesh Shetty
 Manish Raisinghan as Sunny Shetty
 Buddhaditya Mohanty
 Bhawna Roy

External links
Official Site
Online Waaris Videos

Indian television soap operas
Zee TV original programming
2008 Indian television series debuts
2008 Indian television series endings